The Indonesia Ice Hockey Federation, known in Indonesian as the Federasi Hoki Es Indonesia (FHEI), is the governing body of ice hockey in Indonesia. The federation joined the International Ice Hockey Federation (IIHF) as an associate member on 20 May 2016.

National teams
Men's national team
Men's U20 national team

Participation by year
2017

Indonesia did not enter in any 2017 IIHF World Championship tournaments.

2018

Indonesia did not enter in any 2018 IIHF World Championship tournaments.

2019

Indonesia did not enter in any 2019 IIHF World Championship tournaments.

2020

Indonesia did not enter in any 2020 IIHF World Championship tournaments.

Leagues
Indonesia Ice Hockey League
Indonesia Ice Hockey Tournament

References

External links
Official website of the Federasi Hoki Es Indonesia 
Indonesia at IIHF.com

Ice hockey in Indonesia
Ice hockey governing bodies in Asia
International Ice Hockey Federation members
Ice Hockey